SPSU may refer to:
 Southern Polytechnic State University
 Sir Padampat Singhania University